The 2009 Kazakhstan First Division was the 15th edition of Kazakhstan First Division, the second level football competition in Kazakhstan. Unlike the previous years, number of teams were shortened, due to creation of reserve teams league for Premier League teams. Thus, this season 14 teams started to play against each other on home-away system. The best team gains promotion to the Premier League next season while the runner-up will meet with the 11th placed team of the Top tier for the place in the Premier League. League started on May 1 and finished on October 25

League table

External links
Final standings and results 
Clubs roster

Kazakhstan First Division seasons
2
Kazakhstan
Kazakhstan